The Cuelei River (Kwelei) is a river in central Angola of southwestern Africa. For part of its length, it forms the border between Bié Province to the north and Cuando Cubango Province to the south. Its major tributary the Cuceque, and its tributary the Missango, also form part of that boundary.

It flows basically south for its entire length. The Cuelei flows into the Cuchi which flows into the Cubango.

Notes

External links
 Railway bridge over the Cuelei River about 30 km west of Menongue 

Rivers of Angola